The 2018 Pan American Fencing Championships was held in Havana, Cuba from 15 to 20 June 2018 at the Coliseo de la Ciudad Deportiva.

The top seven teams (+ hosts Peru) in each team event qualified for the 2019 Pan American Games in Lima, Peru. After the seven teams in each event were determined, the top two athletes per individual event not qualified through a team would also qualify.

Schedule

Medal summary

Men's events

Women's events

Medal table

Results

Men

Foil individual

Épée individual

Sabre individual

Foil team

Épée team

Sabre team

Women

Foil individual

Épée individual

Sabre individual

Foil team

Épée team

Sabre team

See also 
Fencing at the 2019 Pan American Games – Qualification

References

Pan American Fencing Championships
Pan American Fencing Championships
International sports competitions hosted by Cuba
Pan American Fencing Championships
Sports competitions in Havana
Fencing in Cuba
Qualification tournaments for the 2019 Pan American Games
Pan American Fencing Championships